Alexis Flavien Tibidi (born 10 July 1975) is a Cameroonian former professional footballer who played as a midfielder.

Personal life
Tibidi is the father of the France youth international footballer Alexis Tibidi, Jr.

References

1975 births
Living people
Cameroonian footballers
Association football midfielders
Cameroon international footballers
Mitra Surabaya players
Sabah F.C. (Malaysia) players
K.S.K. Ronse players
Arema F.C. players
Persibom Bolaang Mongondow players
PSBL Langsa players
Cameroonian expatriate footballers
Expatriate footballers in Spain
Cameroonian expatriate sportspeople in Spain
Expatriate footballers in Indonesia
Cameroonian expatriate sportspeople in Indonesia
Expatriate footballers in Malaysia
Cameroonian expatriate sportspeople in Malaysia
Expatriate footballers in Belgium
Cameroonian expatriate sportspeople in Belgium